The Minister for the Interior is the Ghanaian government official responsible for the Ministry of Interior. He is thus responsible for internal security and law and order in Ghana. The most recent person in this position is Hon.Ambrose Dery. The position has also been known as Minister for Internal Affairs in the past.

List of ministers
The first Ghanaian to head this ministry was Ebenezer Ako-Adjei. He was also one of The Big Six instrumental in Ghana attaining its independence from the United Kingdom.

See also

Ministry of Interior (Ghana)

References

Politics of Ghana
Interior